John Taylor (born December 25, 1989) is an American professional basketball player for Pioneros de Los Mochis. He played college basketball at Fresno Pacific where he led the NCAA Division II in scoring his junior year before declaring for the 2013 NBA draft.

High school career
Taylor attended Gary Lew Wallace until his sophomore year then transferred back home to North Lawndale High School in Chicago, Illinois for his last 2 years and led them to a 2A state title as a junior and a City League championship as a senior in 2009. He was the 6th best player in Chicago according to Rivals. And the #1 Point Guard of his class (09).  

|}

College career
Taylor attended Chipola Community College his freshman year then went on to transfer to Mott Community College for his final juco year. He was the JUCO Player of the Year in 2012 after scoring 24.9 points per game and scoring over 40 in three different contests. He also led Mott to a NJCAA DIV2 championship in JUCO his sophomore season. After Mott, Taylor committed to Fresno Pacific in June 2012. He spent one season at the school and he led NCAA Division II in scoring with 27.5 points per game and had a career-high 50 points against Roberts Wesleyan. He was named the PacWest Newcomer of the Year. And holds the record for most points scored (50) in Fresno Pacific history.

Professional career
Taylor declared for the 2013 NBA draft but went undrafted. He went to the 2013 Eurobasket summer league tryouts, but did not make a team. He was then later signed to Team Amsterdam of the Eurobasket S-League and later signed to Team Lugano of the Eurobasket S-League. After that he was signed to the Sacramento Heatwave of the American Basketball Association. After the first game with the Sacramento Heatwave he signed to play in one of Mexico's top leagues (LNBP) with Juarez Indios and became a household name in South America.

References

External links
Fpuathletics.com
Basketball.usbasket.com
Espn.go.com
Basketball.realgm.com

Living people
1989 births
American expatriate basketball people in Chile
American expatriate basketball people in Kazakhstan
American expatriate basketball people in Mexico
American expatriate basketball people in the Netherlands
American men's basketball players
Basketball players from Chicago
Fresno Pacific Sunbirds men's basketball players
Junior college men's basketball players in the United States
Laguneros de La Comarca players
Point guards
Venados de Mazatlán (basketball) players
Pioneros de Los Mochis players